Anthony Gomez (born November 7, 1981) is an American professional boxer, mixed martial artist and kickboxer currently competing in the Heavyweight division. A professional MMA competitor since 2006, he has competed for Bellator MMA.

Background
Anthony met Miguel Torres in 2001 and started training under him full-time in 2006 under his Torres Martial Arts Academy camp in Indiana, before this Gomez wrestled at North Central College. Anthony has also competed in 2 North American Grappling Association tournaments in the 100+ kg division, losing both in the semi-finals.

Mixed martial arts career

Early career
Turning professional in 2006, Gomez compiled a record of 5–1 before making his debut for Bellator MMA. Most of his wins were by stoppage.

Bellator MMA
Gomez debuted for Bellator in March 2012 at Bellator 60, he faced Travis Wiuff. Gomez was defeated via unanimous decision.

In his next appearance for Bellator, Gomez faced Jose Medina at Bellator 75 on October 5, 2012. Gomez won the fight via rear-naked choke submission in the first round.

Gomez then faced Anton Talamantes at Bellator 84 on December 14, 2012. He won by submission in round one.

Gomez faced Jason Guida on March 14, 2014, at Bellator 112. Gomez won via three-round unanimous decision.

Mixed martial arts record

|-
|Loss
|align=center|10-3
|William Penn
|Decision (unanimous)
|HFC 24: Gomez vs. Penn
|
|align=center|3
|align=center|5:00
|Valparaiso, Indiana, United States
|
|-
|Win
|align=center|10-2
|Miodrag Petkovic
|TKO (punches)
|UCL: Havoc in Hammond 2
|
|align=center|2
|align=center|1:11
|Hammond, Indiana, United States
|
|-
|Win
|align=center|9–2
|Robert Morrow
|Submission (triangle choke)
|Hoosier Fight Club 23
|
|align=center|1
|align=center|4:23
|Valparaiso, Indiana, United States
|
|-
|Win
|align=center|8–2
|Jason Guida
|Decision (unanimous)
|Bellator 112
|
|align=center|3
|align=center|5:00
|Hammond, Indiana, United States
|
|-
|Win
|align=center|7–2
|Anton Talamantes
|Submission (rear-naked choke)
|Bellator 84
|
|align=center|1
|align=center|3:30
|Hammond, Indiana, United States
|
|-
|Win
|align=center|6–2
|Jose Medina
|Submission (rear-naked choke)
| Bellator 75
|
|align=center|1
|align=center|2:32
|Hammond, Indiana, United States
|
|-
|Loss
|align=center|5–2
|Travis Wiuff
|Decision (unanimous)
|Bellator 60
|
|align=center|3
|align=center|5:00
|Hammond, Indiana, United States
|
|-
|Win
|align=center|5–1
|Lew Polley
|Decision (split)
|Hoosier FC 4: Showdown at the Steel Yard
|
|align=center|3
|align=center|5:00
|Gary, Indiana, United States
|
|-
|Win
|align=center|4–1
|Will Hill
|Submission (armbar)
|Total Fight Challenge 16
|
|align=center|3
|align=center|3:00
|Hammond, Indiana, United States
|
|-
|Win
|align=center|3–1
|Lee Defoose
|TKO (punches)
|Total Fight Challenge 15
|
|align=center|1
|align=center|1:17
|Hammond, Indiana, United States
|
|-
| Win
|align=center|2–1
|Dan Bolden
|TKO (punches)
|Total Fight Challenge 11
|
|align=center|2
|align=center|2:20
|Hammond, Indiana, United States
|
|-
|Win
|align=center|1–1
|Derek Thornton
|Decision (unanimous)
|IMMAC 2: Attack
|
|align=center|3
|align=center|5:00
|Chicago, Illinois, United States
|
|-
|Loss
|align=center|0–1
|Krzysztof Kulak
|Decision (split)
|IMMAC 1: Attack
|
|align=center|3
|align=center|5:00
|Chicago, Illinois, United States
|
|-

References

External links

1982 births
Living people
American mixed martial artists of Mexican descent
American male mixed martial artists
Heavyweight mixed martial artists
Light heavyweight mixed martial artists
Mixed martial artists utilizing collegiate wrestling
Mixed martial artists utilizing Muay Thai
Mixed martial artists utilizing boxing
Mixed martial artists utilizing Brazilian jiu-jitsu
American practitioners of Brazilian jiu-jitsu
American Muay Thai practitioners
American male kickboxers
American male sport wrestlers
Boxers from Chicago
North Central College alumni
Sportspeople from Chicago